Mooky is a location-based social and dating application, designed to help its users to find the perfect match by providing a large scale of filters. It runs on Android only for now. Available for download from Google Play, Mooky comes free of charge. The app makes use of mobile devices' geolocation, a feature of smart phones and other devices which allows users to locate other users who are nearby. This is accomplished through a user interface that displays a grid of representative photos of users. If both users like each other, they become a match. When users are a match, they are able to chat. This way users won't get unwanted chats.

History 
Mooky was published on Google Play on April 17, 2016, by Mooky BV. The latest version of this application is version 1.0.6. This app is compatible with Android devices with version 4.0.3 and higher.

Overview

How it works 
Mooky uses Facebook to build a user profile with photos and basic information, like the users surname and age. From there on the user has to fill in their Mooky profile, which contains information about the users height, posture, haircolor, eyecolor, ethnicity and religion. After this the user can select its preferences to find matches nearby.

User verification 
Mooky has a different way of verifying its users. Mooky asks their users to take a selfie holding a piece of paper saying 'Mooky'. Mooky will then manually accept or decline the user verification.

See also 
 OkCupid
 Coffee Meets Bagel
 Tinder (app)

References 

*

External links 
 
 Android App of the Day (Review)
 Mooky - Easy to Use Dating App with Great User Base (Review)

Android (operating system) software
Mobile applications